Valencia High School is a high school (grades 9–12) that opened in the fall of 2006 in Los Lunas, Valencia County, New Mexico. Formerly known as the "Los Lunas Career Academy", the high school serves students on the east side of the Rio Grande with the exception of students who attended Ann Parish Elementary School.

The school campus was founded in 2000 by Claire Fenton under the name of "Los Lunas Career Academy", then a satellite campus of the only high school in Los Lunas, Los Lunas High School. The site adopted the name of Valencia High School shortly after the district re-zoned and create Los Lunas' second formal high school in 2005. Additions to the campus were constructed using $6.3 million from the Public Schools Capital Outlay Commission.

The school mascot is the Jaguar, and official school colors are turquoise, red and silver.

The school opened in fall 2006 with its first freshman class. The first full four-year graduating group was the class of 2010.

The school's facilities include a weight room, wrestling room, gymnasium and locker rooms, two soccer fields, a football stadium with an all-weather track, a baseball field, softball field, field house, and a newly built Performing Arts Center.

Performing Arts Center  

 In 2017, the newly built Performing Arts Center officially opened. The Valencia High School Drama Club and Concert Band host performances there.

Performing arts 

 The Valencia High School Band Program has about 70 students ranging from freshmen to seniors with all grades participating in all bands at every level. There are five different bands including Wind Symphony, Symphonic Band, Jazz I, Jazz II, and Marching Band. Both the concert bands and marching band are in class 2A.
 The Valencia High School Drama Club is run by Drama and English teacher, Carol Stokes.

References

External links 
 llschools.net[https://loslunasvhs.ss13.sharpschool.com/}

Public high schools in New Mexico
Educational institutions established in 2005
Schools in Valencia County, New Mexico
2005 establishments in New Mexico